Samuel Luke Dunell (born 21 February 1990) is an Australian rules football player who played for the St Kilda Football Club in the Australian Football League (AFL) and then played for Williamstown in the Victorian Football League (VFL) from 2015-2019 where he played 100 games for them, kicking 158 goals. He played for Victoria against SA in 2016 and was twice named in the VFL Team of the Year. He finished 2nd in the VFL Liston trophy in 2015 capping off the season with an all conquering premiership win against Box Hill at Docklands. At one stage he was considered the best player in the VFL. He was Club leading goalkicker in 2015 with 41 majors and 2016 with 37 goals, and was runner-up in the Club best and fairest in 2015 and in third place in 2016. He received life membership in 2019 after his final game for Williamstown in the 2019 grand defeat defeat by Richmond.

AFL 
Dunell was recruited by St Kilda in the 2012 Rookie Draft, with pick 12. He made his debut in Round 16, 2012, against  at the Gabba.

Cricket 
Dunell vice-captained Under 12 cricket for Victoria alongside current Australian fast bowler James Pattinson. He then vice-captained the first eleven cricket team at Melbourne Grammar School. He also played seconds premier cricket for Essendon Cricket Club until 2011 when he decided to play professional football.

References

External links

 

1990 births
Living people
St Kilda Football Club players
Bendigo Football Club players
Sandringham Football Club players
Williamstown Football Club players
Australian rules footballers from Victoria (Australia)